Kalecik is a town and district of Ankara Province in the Central Anatolia region of Turkey. According to 2010 census, population of the district is 14,517 of which 9,450 live in the town of Kalecik.

Kalecik stands on a plain with the eastern boundary formed by the River Kızılırmak while there are mountains to the south and the west. This agricultural district is known for its wine; other major crops include sugar beet and grains.

The popular grape variety Kalecik Karası grows successfully near the Kızılırmak and is used to make some of Turkey's best red wine.

History
The area has a history going back to the Hittites and even never  earlier (4000 BC). In the Ottoman Empire period this was a thriving town recorded by the 17th-century traveler Evliya Çelebi as being a trading city with tanneries, coppersmiths, and weavers.

Education
The vocational school of higher education in Kalecik, part of Ankara University, educates in viticulture and winemaking.

Places of interest
 Kalecik Castle, an Ancient Roman ruin on the rock above the town
 Kalecik Bridge

Villages in the district

Notes

References

External links
 Kalecik Tanıtım Gönüllüleri & www.kalecik.com.tr 

 
Populated places in Ankara Province
Districts of Ankara Province